Ko Tint Toh Super Yat Kwat is a 2014 Burmese comedy film, directed by Kyaw Zaw Lin. The film, produced by Sein Htay Film Production premiered in Myanmar on December 5, 2014.

Cast
A Yine as Ko Tint
Moe Pyae Pyae Maung as Mi Cho
Myint Myat as Kaung Myat
Sandi Myint Lwin as Dee Dee
Phyo Ngwe Soe as Aung Min Naing
Yan Aung as Mal Kin
Lu Min as Baydin Sayar
Aung Ye Lin as Aung San Toe
Phway Phway as Khin Chaw
Soe Myat Thuzar as Daw Thuzar
Khin Hlaing as Pu Lone
Aye Aye Khine as Ma Yin Aye
Nay Toe as Toe Gyi
Thet Mon Myint as Ma Mhway
Dain Daung as Maung Khain
Gone Pone as Ei Mon
Nyi Nanda as Htun Htun
Yoon Shwe Yi as San San
Pyay Ti Oo as Thu Ta
Wutt Hmone Shwe Yi as Wutt Hmone
Min Maw Kun as Nay Min Thar
Eaindra Kyaw Zin as La Min May

References

2014 films
2010s Burmese-language films
Burmese comedy films
Films shot in Myanmar
2014 comedy films